Women, Fire, and Dangerous Things: What Categories Reveal about the Mind is a non-fiction book by the cognitive linguist George Lakoff.  The book, first published by the University of Chicago Press in 1987, puts forward a model of cognition argued on the basis of semantics.  The book emphasizes the centrality of metaphor, defined as the mapping of cognitive structures from one domain onto another, in the cognitive process.  Women, Fire, and Dangerous Things explores the effects of cognitive metaphors, both culturally specific and human-universal, on the grammar per se of several languages, and the evidence of the limitations of the classical logical-positivist or Anglo-American School philosophical concept of the category usually used to explain or describe the scientific method.

The book's title was inspired by the noun class system of the Dyirbal language, in which the "feminine" category includes nouns for women, water, fire, violence, and certain animals.

See also
 Image schema
 Structuralism
 Taxonomy (general)

References

1987 non-fiction books
Cognitive science literature
Linguistics books